The 4th APAN Star Awards ceremony was held on November 28, 2015, at Wonju Gymnasium in Wonju, Gangwon Province and was broadcast live on MBC Every 1 and V Live. Lee Hwi-jae, Kim Sung-joo, Lee Hoon and T-ara's Park So-yeon were the host of the award ceremony. First held in 2012, the annual awards ceremony recognizes the excellence in South Korea's television. The nominees were chosen from 98 Korean dramas that aired on broadcasting networks MBC, KBS and SBS and cable channels tvN, jtbc, OCN, MBN and TV Chosun from October 1, 2014, to October 30, 2015.

The highest honor of the ceremony, Grand Prize (Daesang), was awarded to the actor Kim Soo-hyun of the drama series The Producers.

Nominations and winners

Winners are listed first, highlighted in boldface, and indicated with a dagger.

References

External links
 

APAN
APAN Star Awards
APAN Star Awards